Ellis Archer is a professional rugby league footballer who plays as a  for Barrow Raiders in the RFL Championship. He started his senior career at St Helens (Heritage № 1280) in the Betfred Super League.

Archer made his first team début for Saints in August 2022 against Wakefield Trinity.

References

External links
St Helens profile
Saints Heritage Society profile

2004 births
Living people
Barrow Raiders players
English rugby league players
Rugby league halfbacks
Rugby league players from Barrow-in-Furness
St Helens R.F.C. players